Sir Gilbert Gerard, 1st Baronet  of Harrow on the Hill (23 October 1587 – 6 January 1670),  was an English politician who sat in the House of Commons  at various times between 1614 and 1660. He was a supporter of the Parliamentary cause during the English Civil War and of Oliver Cromwell during the Protectorate.

Biography
Gerard was the son of William Gerard (died 1609) of Flambards, Harrow-on-the-Hill and his wife Dorothy Ratcliff, daughter of John Ratcliff of Langley. He succeeded his father in 1609, inheriting Flambards in Harrow .

Gilbert served as Clerk of the Council of the Duchy of Lancaster from 1609 to 1640. He was elected Member of Parliament for Wigan in 1614 and created a baronet in 1620. In 1621 he was elected MP for Middlesex. In 1624, he was elected MP for both Middlesex and Newtown, Isle of Wight but chose to sit for Middlesex. He was elected again for Middlesex in 1625 and 1626. In 1626, he was also appointed High Sheriff of Buckinghamshire. 

In April 1640, Gerard was elected MP for Middlesex for the Short Parliament and in November the same year for the Long Parliament. He showed himself to be an enemy to the Earl of Strafford, and afterwards joined the Parliamentary cause against the King. He was appointed Colonel of the Middlesex Trained Bands and to the Committee of Both Kingdoms, and he was made paymaster of the Parliamentary army. He had three-pence in the pound allowance, worth fifty thousand pounds and also was appointed Chancellor of the Duchy of Lancaster. The Lord Protector Oliver Cromwell made him a lord of his Upper House.

After Richard Cromwell's resignation as Protector Gerard was refused admission to the House of Commons because of his alliance to and friendship for the Cromwells.  He had the courage to bring an action against Colonel , who had personally stopped him as he was entering the House; but Parliament ordered the action to be dropped, as it was done by their order. The Army soon after obtaining the superiority, he was nominated one of the new Council of State. In April 1660, he was elected MP for Lancaster. He survived the restoration, dying on 6 January 1670, and was buried at Harrow.

Family
In 1614 Gerard married Mary, a daughter of Sir Francis Barrington and Joan Cromwell, and a cousin of Oliver Cromwell. He thereby acquired that year the manor of Aston Clinton in Buckinghamshire.

Notes

References

 

Attribution

 

1587 births
1670 deaths
Roundheads
High Sheriffs of Buckinghamshire
Chancellors of the Duchy of Lancaster
English MPs 1614
English MPs 1621–1622
English MPs 1624–1625
English MPs 1625
English MPs 1626
English MPs 1640 (April)
English MPs 1640–1648
English MPs 1660
Baronets in the Baronetage of England
Middlesex Militia officers
People_from_Harrow_on_the_Hill
Members of Cromwell's Other House